Elections to Liverpool City Council were held on Monday 2 November 1903.

Wavertree West was a new ward with 1 seat elected.

All three seats in each of the Wavertree and West Derby wards were contested.

This was the first Liverpool City Council election that the Liverpool Protestant Party took part. Protestant candidates stood in four wards, Breckfield, Garston, Kirkdale and St. Domingo.  Three of these wards, Garston, Kirkdale and St. Domingo returned Protestant councillors.

Of the 38 seats up for election, 14 were not contested.

After the election, the composition of the council was:

Election result

In view of the significant number of uncontested seats (14 of 38), these statistics should be taken in that context.

Ward results

* - Retiring Councillor seeking re-election

Comparisons are made with the 1900 election results, as the retiring councillors were elected in that year.

Abercromby

Aigburth

Anfield

Breckfield

Brunswick

Castle Street

Dingle

Edge Hill

Everton

Exchange

Fairfield

Garston

Granby

Great George

Kensington

Kirkdale

Low Hill

Netherfield

North Scotland

Old Swan

Prince's Park

Sandhills

St. Anne's

St. Domingo

St. Peter's

Sefton Park East

Sefton Park West

South Scotland

Vauxhall

Walton

Warbreck

Wavertree

Wavertree West

West Derby

Aldermanic Elections

The Council (Councillors and Aldermen) elected Councillor William Edward Willink (Conservative, Prince's Park, elected 1 November 1901) as an Alderman for the new ward of Wavertree West on 9 November 1903

Councillor Jacob Reuben Grant (Conservative, Walton, elected 1 November 1901) was elected by the Council as an alderman for the new ward of Old Swan on 9 November 1903.

 The death of Alderman Herbert Campbell (Conservative) on 7 December 1903 was reported to the Council on 9 December 1903. His position was filled when Councillor Robert Alfred Hampson (Conservative, Aigburth, elected 19 November 1903) was elected as an alderman by the Council on 3 February 1904.

 The resignation of Alderman Dr. Thomas Clarke was reported to the Council on 9 November 1903. Councillor Edward Burns (Conservative, Kensington, elected 2 November 1903) was elected as an alderman by the Council on 2 December 1903.

 The resignation of Alderman Alexander Murray Bligh  (Irish Nationalist, elected 28 May 1902) was reported to the Council on 9 November 1903.  Councillor John Lawrence (Conservative, Castle Street, elected 1 November 1902) was elected as an alderman on 2 December 1903.

 Councillor John Duncan (Conservative, Breckfield. elected 2 November 1903) was elected as an alderman

.

 Following the death of Alderman John Lawrence, Councillor William Oulton (Liberal Unionist, Everton, elected 1 November 1901) was elected as an alderman on 1 June 1904.

 Alderman John Ellison died on 17 October 1904

By-elections

No. 3A Walton, 19 November 1903

Caused by the election by the Council of Councillor Jacob Reuben Grant (Conservative, Walton, elected 1 November 1901) as an alderman for the new ward of Old Swan on 9 November 1903.

No. 29 Aigburth, 19 November 1903

Caused by the resignation of Councillor Arthur Twiss Kemble (Conservative, Aigburth, elected unopposed 1 November 1902) which was reported to the Council on 9 November 1903.

No. 23 Prince's Park, 24 November 1903

Caused by the election by the Council of Councillor William Edward Willink (Conservative, Prince's Park, elected 1 November 1901) as an Alderman on 9 November 1903.

No. 11 Kensington, 16 December 1903

Caused by the election to Alderman of Councillor Edward Burns (Conservative, Kensington, elected 2 November 1903).

No. 18 Castle Street, 16 December 1903

Caused by the election as alderman of Councillor John Lawrence (Conservative, Castle Street, elected 1 November 1902)

No. 21 Abercomby, 19 January 1904

Caused by the resignation of Councillor Dr. Charles Alexander Hill (Conservative, Abercromby, elected 2 November 1903) was reported to the Council on 6 January 1904

No. 3A Walton, 26 February 1904

Caused by the resignation of Councillor John Brunswick (Conservative, Walton, elected 2 November 1903) which was reported to the Council on 10 February 1904.

No. 29 Aigburth, 26 February 1904

Caused by the election as an alderman of Councillor Robert Alfred Hampson (Conservative, Aigburth, elected 19 November 1903)

The Term of Office to expire 1 November 1905

No. 17 St. Anne's, 17 May 1904

Caused by the resignation of Councillor Julius Jacobs (Conservative, St. Anne's, elected 1 November 1902).

The term of office to expire on 1 November 1905
.

No. 6 Breckfield, 26 May 1904

Caused by Councillor John Duncan (Conservative, Breckfield. elected 2 November 1903) being elected as an alderman.

The term of office to expire on 1 November 1906
.

No. 9 Everton, 15 June 1904

Following the death of Alderman John Lawrence, Councillor William Oulton 
(Liberal Unionist, Everton, elected 1 November 1901) was elected as an alderman.

No. 16 Exchange, 6 October 1904

Councillor Alexander Allan Paton (Liberal, Exchange, elected 15 June 1903) died 8 September 1903

No. 28A Old Swan, 18 October 1904

Caused by the resignation of Councillor Thomas Utley (Liberal, West Derby, elected 1 November 1902), which was reported to the Council on 5 October 1904.

See also

 Liverpool City Council
 Liverpool Town Council elections 1835 - 1879
 Liverpool City Council elections 1880–present
 Mayors and Lord Mayors of Liverpool 1207 to present
 History of local government in England

References

1903
Liverpool
Liverpool City Council election
City Council election, 1903